Lee Jung-gil (born October 1, 1944) is a South Korean actor. After making his acting debut in 1967 in the stage play Sakhalinsk's The Sky and the Earth, Lee has had a prolific career in Korean television and film.

Filmography

Television series

Switch (SBS, 2018)
Memory (tvN, 2016)
My Daughter, Geum Sa-wol (MBC, 2015)
The Greatest Marriage (TV Chosun, 2014)
Cunning Single Lady (MBC, 2014)
My Love from the Star (SBS, 2013)
Melody of Love (KBS2, 2013)
Don't Look Back: The Legend of Orpheus (KBS2, 2013)
Iris II: New Generation (KBS2, 2013)
Cheer Up, Mr. Kim! (KBS1, 2012)
The Chaser (SBS, 2012) (cameo)
Angel's Choice (MBC, 2012)
How Long I've Kissed (jTBC, 2012)
Scent of a Woman (SBS, 2011)
Romance Town (KBS2, 2011)
Pit-a-pat, My Love (KBS2, 2011)
Athena: Goddess of War (SBS, 2010)
You Don't Know Women (SBS, 2010)
Dong Yi (MBC, 2010)
Don't Hesitate (SBS, 2009)
Iris (KBS2, 2009)
My Fair Lady (KBS2, 2009)
Partner (KBS2, 2009)
Boys Over Flowers (KBS2, 2009)
My Life's Golden Age (MBC, 2008)
My Sweet Seoul (SBS, 2008)
You Stole My Heart (KBS2, 2008)
Likeable or Not (KBS1, 2007)
Flowers for My Life (KBS2, 2007)
Moon Hee (MBC, 2007)
Behind the White Tower (MBC, 2007)
Yeon Gaesomun (SBS, 2006)
A Woman's Choice (KBS2, 2006)
Tree of Heaven (SBS, 2006)
Jikji (MBC, 2005)
Resurrection (KBS2, 2005)
The Secret Lovers (MBC, 2005)
Pharmacist Kim's Daughters (MBC, 2005)
5th Republic (MBC, 2005)
Lovers in Prague (SBS, 2005)
2004 Human Market (SBS, 2004)
April Kiss (KBS2, 2004)
Oh Feel Young (KBS2, 2004)
Land (SBS, 2004)
Desert Spring (MBC, 2003)
One Million Roses (KBS1, 2003)
Pearl Necklace (KBS2, 2003)
Escape From Unemployment (SBS, 2003)
Lovers (SBS, 2003)
Land of Wine (SBS, 2003)
Girl's High School Days (KBS2, 2002)
Rival (SBS, 2002)
Man of the Sun, Lee Je-ma (KBS2, 2002)
Who's My Love (KBS2, 2002)
Sidestreet People (KBS2, 2002)
Man of Autumn (MBC, 2001)
Purity (KBS2, 2001)
Four Sisters (MBC, 2001)
Beautiful Days (SBS, 2001)
Tender Hearts (KBS1, 2001)
The Full Sun (KBS2, 2000)
Juliet's Man (SBS, 2000)
RNA (KBS2, 2000)
Say It with Your Eyes (MBC, 2000)
Nice Man (SBS, 2000)
I'm Still Loving You (MBC, 1999)
Wave (SBS, 1999)
The King and the Queen (KBS1, 1998)
Song of the Wind (SBS, 1998)
Fascinate My Heart (SBS, 1998)
Spring After Winter (SBS, 1998)
The Era of the Three Kims (SBS, 1998)
Passionate Love (KBS2, 1997)
Happy Morning (KBS2, 1997)
The Reason I Live (MBC, 1997)
Landscaping with My Wife (KBS2, 1996)
Beginning of Happiness (SBS, 1996)
Wealthy Yu-chun (SBS, 1996)
Im Kkeok-jung (SBS, 1996)
Korea Gate (SBS, 1995)
Dazzling Dawn (KBS1, 1995)
Asphalt Man (SBS, 1995)
What Have You Done Yet (SBS, 1994)
밥을 태우는 여자 (KBS2, 1994)
Scent of Love (SBS, 1994)
Goblin Is Coming (SBS, 1994)
3rd Republic (MBC, 1993)
당신 없는 행복이란 (MBC, 1993)
The Kingdom of Anger (MBC, 1992)
Three Families Under One Roof (MBC, 1992)
행복어사전 (MBC, 1991)
Eyes of Dawn (MBC, 1991)
Betrayal of the Rose (MBC, 1990)
2nd Republic (MBC, 1989)
Happy Woman (MBC, 1989)
For the Emperor (MBC, 1989)
Our Town (MBC, 1988)
The Last Icon (MBC, 1988)
Three Ladies (MBC, 1988)
Temptation (MBC, 1987)
막차로 온 손님 (MBC, 1987)
Roll of Thunder (MBC, 1987)
Tomorrow and Tomorrow (MBC, 1987)
The Face of a City (MBC, 1987)
500 Years of Joseon - The Hoechun Gate (MBC, 1986)
500 Years of Joseon - The Wind Orchid (MBC, 1985)
You (MBC, 1984)
I Miss You (MBC, 1984)
Sunflower in Winter (MBC, 1983)
500 Years of Joseon - The King of Chudong Palace (MBC, 1983)
Women's History - Hwang Jin-yi (MBC, 1983)
나라야 (MBC, 1982)
Linger (MBC, 1982)
Nocturne (MBC, 1981)
Embrace (MBC, 1981)
Annyeong haseyo (Hello) (MBC, 1981)
Royal Emissary (MBC, 1981-1984)
1st Republic (MBC, 1981)
새아씨 (MBC, 1981)
Hongsa Lantern (MBC, 1980)
Endpoint (MBC, 1980)
Gan-yang-rok (MBC, 1980)
Baebijangjeon (MBC, 1980)
Spring Rain (MBC, 1979)
Who Are You (MBC, 1979)
Hope (KBS, 1979)
Mom and Dad, I Like You (MBC, 1979)
Blowing of the Wind (MBC, 1978)
Hot Hand (MBC, 1978)
Yeon-jae (MBC, 1978)
Trap of Youth (MBC, 1978)
정부인 (MBC, 1978)
사미인곡 (MBC, 1976)
내일이면 (MBC, 1976)
귀로 (MBC, 1975)
제3교실 (MBC, 1975)
Narcissus (MBC, 1974)

Film
I Love You (2001)
Today's Woman (1989)
Affection (1987)
Madame Aema 3 (1985)
The Popular Student (1977) 
Towards the High Place (1977)
Good Bye, Sir! (1977)
Two Dreamers (1977)
The Youth (1977)
Prayer of a Girl (1976)
Farewell (1976)
I Must Live (1976)
Black Night (1975)
A Promise (1975) 
Graduating School Girls (1975)
Anna's Will (1975)
Promise of the Flesh (1975)

Awards
1996 SBS Drama Awards: Top Excellence Award, Actor (Beginning of Happiness)
1989 16th Korea Broadcasting Awards: Best Actor (Our Town)
1982 18th Baeksang Arts Awards: Best TV Actor (Nocturne)
1979 15th Baeksang Arts Awards: Best TV Actor (Hot Hand)
1978 MBC Drama Awards: Outstanding Lead Actor, TV category (Hot Hand)
1976 MBC Drama Awards: Excellence Award, Actor

References

External links

South Korean Roman Catholics
1944 births
Living people
South Korean male film actors
South Korean male television actors